Chad A. Johnston is an American NASCAR crew chief. He works for Stewart-Haas Racing and driver Ryan Preece. Johnston was previously a crew chief in the NASCAR Cup Series for Chip Ganassi Racing (the No. 42 of Kyle Larson and later Matt Kenseth), Stewart-Haas Racing (the No. 14 of Tony Stewart), and Michael Waltrip Racing (the No. 56 of Martin Truex Jr.). Johnston was Truex's engineer prior to his promotion by MWR to crew chief midway through the 2011 season.

Racing career
After graduating college at Indiana State University in 2004, Johnston got a job as an engineer for Morgan-Dollar Motorsports in the NASCAR Camping World Truck Series. Over the following years, Johnston became the engineer for teams such as JTG Daugherty Racing and Evernham Motorsports.

In 2011, while doing engineer work for Michael Waltrip Racing, Johnston became the crew chief for the No. 56 team, driven by Martin Truex Jr. Over the 19 races they were together, the pair got 1 pole, 2 top-5's, and 5 top-10's.

The following year, in 2012, Johnston became Truex's full-time crew chief. Truex Jr. and Johnston finished off the season with 1 pole, 19 top-10's, and 7 top-5's. They would finish 11th in the point standings after making the Chase.

In 2013, the pair returned to the No. 56 team. Midway through the season at Sonoma, the team won their first race. They would finish of the season with 1 win, 15 top-10's, 7 top-5's.

Johnston moved over to the No. 14 team for Stewart-Haas Racing, driven by Tony Stewart. However, midway through the season, Stewart decided not to drive for three races, being replaced by Regan Smith for the first of those races and Jeff Burton for the next two after being involved in the death of Kevin Ward Jr. Stewart would return to the seat at Atlanta.

In 2015, Stewart and Johnston would pair up again. However, this season would prove to be a challenge for Stewart, as he would only be able to get 3 top-10's throughout the season, leading up to a 28th place finish in the points standings.

Johnston would again move teams in 2016, this time moving to the No. 42 team at Chip Ganassi Racing, driven by Kyle Larson. At Michigan in the fall, Kyle Larson would get his first win in the Cup Series. The group would end up finishing the season with 1 win, 14 top-10's, and 9 top-5's leading up to a 9th place in the championship standings.

Larson and Johnston would start off the 2017 season with 5 top 2's, one of them being a win. Larson would win 3 more times throughout the season, finishing 8th in the championship standings after having a lack of consistency in the playoffs.

Johnston would remain as Larson's crew chief in 2018 and 2019. After a winless 2018 season, the two won at Dover International Speedway in the fall. In 2020, Johnston would become the crew chief for Matt Kenseth after Kyle Larson was suspended for saying a racial slur during a streamed iRacing event.

Although he did score a second-place finish in the 2020 Brickyard 400 and a tenth place finish in his first race with the team at Darlington in May, Kenseth's return was largely a disappointment, and Johnston was released as the crew chief of the No. 42 on August 4 and replaced by the team's engineer since 2016, Phil Surgen, starting at the Michigan doubleheader. Surgen also substituted for Johnston in the crew chief role for one race in 2016, also coincidentally at Michigan, where he would lead Larson and the team to a third place finish in that race. Johnston had been suspended due to the lug nut rule.

With one race to go in the 2020 ARCA Menards Series West season, Johnston was picked up by DGR-Crosley to crew chief their No. 17 Ford of Taylor Gray in the season-finale at Phoenix, where Gray would finish third in this race. Johnston stayed on with the team, now just known as David Gilliland Racing, in 2021, crew chiefing Gray in his full season in the ARCA Menards Series East and part-time schedule in the main ARCA Menards Series. Also, the team announced that Gray would make his Truck Series debut in 2021, driving the No. 17 Ford part-time, and Johnston would also crew chief Gray in that series.

In December 2022, Johnston returned to Stewart-Haas Racing and the NASCAR Cup Series after it was announced that driver, Ryan Preece would replace Cole Custer in the No. 41 for the 2023 season. Johnston and Preece previously worked together in the Truck Series with David Gilliland Racing, having won together twice, at Nashville Superspeedway in 2021 and 2022.

References

External links
 

Living people
NASCAR crew chiefs
Indiana State University alumni
People from Vermillion County, Indiana
Year of birth missing (living people)